Khamti, Hkamti, Singkawng, Kanti or Kantee is a town in Hkamti District, Sagaing Division, in north-western Myanmar.  It is the administrative center for both the district and Hkamti Township (Khamti Township).

Its airport is known as Khamti Airport.

Climate

Notes

External links
 "Singkaling Hkamti Map – Satellite Images of Singkaling Hkamti" Maplandia.com

Populated places in Hkamti District
Hkamti Township
Township capitals of Myanmar